Sir Francis Goodwin (1564–10 August 1634) was an English politician who sat in the House of Commons at various times between 1586 and 1626.

Goodwin was the son of Sir John Goodwin and his second wife Anne Spencer, daughter of Sir William Spencer. In 1586, he was elected Member of Parliament for Buckinghamshire. He was elected MP for Wycombe in 1589. From 1591 he was a J.P. for Buckinghamshire and in 1596 was commissioner for musters. He succeeded to the title of Upper Winchendon in 1597 on the death of his grandfather, and in that year was elected MP for Buckinghamshire again. He was knighted in 1601.

Goodwin's election for Buckinghamshire in 1604 in circumstances where he was challenged over outlawry led to a significant constitutional confrontation, "Goodwin's Case", between the House of Commons and James I of England. The result was ultimately overturned but Goodwin was elected later that year in a by-election for Buckingham after the death of the sitting MP.  He was elected MP for Buckinghamshire again in 1614. In 1618, he settled the manor of Upper Winchendon on his son Arthur at the time of his marriage.  He was re-elected MP for Buckinghamshire in 1621. He obtained a grant from the king of the whole of his inheritance of Upper Winchendon in about 1623. From 1623 to 1624 he was High Sheriff of Buckinghamshire. He was elected MP for Buckinghamshire again in 1625 and in 1626.

Goodwin died at the age of about 70 in 1634.

Goodwin married Elizabeth Grey, daughter of Arthur Grey, 14th Baron Grey de Wilton. Arthur Goodwin was their son.

References

External links

 

1564 births
1634 deaths
High Sheriffs of Buckinghamshire
English MPs 1586–1587
English MPs 1589
English MPs 1597–1598
English MPs 1604–1611
English MPs 1614
English MPs 1621–1622
English MPs 1625
English MPs 1626